Charles William Loughlin (16 February 1914 – 23 September 1993) was a British Labour Party politician.

Born in Grimsby, Loughlin was educated at St Mary's School.  In 1945, he began working for the Union of Shop, Distributive and Allied Workers as an area organiser, holding the post until 1974.

He was Member of Parliament for West Gloucestershire from 1959 until he stood down at the October 1974 general election.  He was Parliamentary Secretary to the Ministry of Health from 1965 to 1967, Parliamentary Secretary to the Ministry of Social Security from 1967 to 1968 and Parliamentary Secretary to the Ministry of Public Buildings and Works from 1968 to 1970.

References 

Times Guide to the House of Commons February 1974

External links 
 

1914 births
1993 deaths
Labour Party (UK) MPs for English constituencies
Ministers in the Wilson governments, 1964–1970
UK MPs 1959–1964
UK MPs 1964–1966
UK MPs 1966–1970
UK MPs 1970–1974
UK MPs 1974